Kalateh Rudbar (also Romanized as Kalāteh Rūdbār; formerly, Kalateh, also Romanized as Kalāteh) is a city in the Central District of Damghan County, Semnan Province, Iran. At the 2006 census, its population was 2,826, in 711 families. The village of Kalateh was renamed Kalateh Rudbar and elevated to city status on April 14, 2011.

References 

Cities in Semnan Province